SS Sophocles was a 12,300-ton ocean liner of the Aberdeen Line launched in 1921, and later sold to the Shaw, Savill & Albion Line.

Ship history
Sophocles was built at the Harland and Wolff yard in Belfast. She and her sister ship SS Diogenes, like other Aberdeen Line ships were conceived primarily as cargo vessels. Sophocles had accommodation for 130 first class and 420 third class passengers.

In 1926, Sophocles and Diogenes were chartered by Shaw, Savill & Albion for the New Zealand trade. The third class accommodation was greatly improved and both ships benefitted from conversion from coal burning to oil, which brought an increase in speed to 15 knots, for the cost of £70,000 each. At this time Sophocles was renamed Tamaroa and Diogenes was renamed Mataroa.

During World War II Tamaroa served as a troopship during the North African campaign. At the end of hostilities, she was refitted for tourist class only and served on the UK-Panama canal-New Zealand route until her scrapping in 1957.

References
Notes

Bibliography
 Famous liners of the past - Belfast Built - Laurence Dunn, 1964

1921 ships
Ships built in Belfast
Ships of the Aberdeen Line
Ships built by Harland and Wolff